Arthur Leonard "Art" Throop (August 19, 1884 – June 24, 1973) was a Canadian professional ice hockey player. He played for the New Westminster Royals (1913–14) and Portland Rosebuds (1914–15) of the Pacific Coast Hockey Association. He also previously played for the Ottawa Victorias, and during his time there was involved in a 1907 game which saw the death of Bud McCourt. He suffered a blow to the head from an opposing player's stick during a brawl that ensued that game. Throop also spent time in the National Hockey Association with the Toronto Tecumsehs and Haileybury Comets.

Throop died in 1973 at a Haileybury hospital.

He was the last surviving former player of the Haileybury Comets and the Toronto Tecumsehs.

Statistics

References

External links
Art Throop at JustSportsStats
Statistics

1884 births
1973 deaths
Haileybury Comets players
Ice hockey people from Ottawa
New Westminster Royals players
Pittsburgh Lyceum (ice hockey) players
Portland Rosebuds players
Toronto Tecumsehs players
Canadian ice hockey left wingers